Jelly fungi are a paraphyletic group of several heterobasidiomycete fungal orders from different classes of the subphylum Agaricomycotina: Tremellales, Dacrymycetales, Auriculariales and Sebacinales.  These fungi are so named because their foliose, irregularly branched fruiting body is, or appears to be, the consistency of jelly.  Actually, many are somewhat rubbery and gelatinous. When dried, jelly fungi become hard and shriveled; when exposed to water, they return to their original form.

Many species of jelly fungi can be eaten raw; poisonous jelly fungi are rare. However, many species have an unpalatable texture or taste. They may or may not be sought in mushroom hunting due to their taste, which is described as similar to that of soil. However, some species, Tremella fuciformis for example, are not only edible but prized for use in soup and vegetable dishes.

Notable jelly fungi
Ascocoryne sarcoides – jelly drops, purple jellydisc (often mistaken for basidiomycota but is not)
Auricularia auricula-judae – wood ear, Judas' ear, black fungus, jelly ear
Auricularia polytricha – cloud ear
Calocera cornea
Calocera viscosa – yellow tuning fork, yellow stagshorn fungus
Dacrymyces palmatus – orange jelly
Dacryopinax spathularia
Exidia glandulosa – black jelly roll, witches' butter
Exidia recisa - amber jelly roll, willow brain
Guepiniopsis alpina – golden jelly cone
Phlogiotis helvelloides – apricot jelly
Myxarium nucleatum – crystal brain, granular jelly roll
Pseudohydnum gelatinosum – jelly tooth, jelly tongue
Tremella foliacea – jelly leaf
Tremella fuciformis – snow fungus
Tremella mesenterica – witches' butter, yellow brain fungus
Tremellodendron and Sebacina spp. – jellied false corals

See also 
 Cloud ear fungus

Notes

References

External links
AmericanMushrooms.com: Jelly Fungi

Agaricomycotina
Fungus common names
Mushroom types
Basidiomycota